The African Women's Junior Handball Championship is the official competition for junior women's national handball teams of Africa, organized by the African Handball Confederation, under the supervision of the International Handball Federation and takes place every two years. In addition to crowning the African champions, the tournament also serves as a qualifying tournament for the Women's World Junior Championship.

Summary

Medal count

Participation details

 Team was disqualified.

See also
 African Women's Handball Championship
 African Women's Youth Handball Championship

References

External links
African Junior Men's & Women's Championship history - cahbonline

Juniors
Women's sports competitions in Africa
Youth sport in Africa